The following is a list of massacres that occurred in the Croatian War of Independence. Numbers may be approximate.

See also
List of massacres in Yugoslavia
List of massacres in Bosnia and Herzegovina
List of massacres in Serbia
List of massacres in Slovenia
List of massacres in the Independent State of Croatia, massacres that occurred on the territory of the Independent State of Croatia between 1941 and 1945

References

Sources
 
 
 

Croatia
Massacres

Croatia

Croatian War